Porto d'Ascoli (Ascoli's Harbour) is a modern residential quarter of San Benedetto del Tronto in the Province of Ascoli Piceno, Marche region.

History
It commemorates in its name the building of a port, in 1245, at the end of Tronto river, built for the concession of Frederick II for the town of Ascoli Piceno. Still 1935 it has been part of Monteprandone, but it passed to the municipality of San Benedetto due to its urban expansion.

Geography

Porto d'Ascoli is situated at the end of Tronto river, on the Riviera delle Palme (Marche), in the south of San Benedetto del Tronto and close to its urban area.

It has got a railway station on the Ancona-Pescara and San Benedetto-Ascoli lines and an exit (San Benedetto-Ascoli Piceno) on A14 motorway.

Between San Benedetto del Tronto and Porto d'Ascoli it lies the Riviera della Palme stadium home of Sambenedettese football club.

Natural environment
To the south of Porto d'Ascoli and on the Tronto river lies the Sentina, a nature reserve instituted in 2004.

See also
San Benedetto del Tronto
Riviera delle Palme (Marche)
March of Ancona

References

External links
 Municipal site of San Benedetto del Tronto

Frazioni of the Province of Ascoli Piceno
San Benedetto del Tronto
Coastal towns in the Marche